Wolverhampton Sporting Community Football Club is a football club originally formed in Wolverhampton, but currently based in Great Wyrley, the club competes in the . Originally formed as Chubb Sports F.C. they lost their home club and pitches due to the Chubb lock and safe factory closing down and being sold for housing. The club then changed its name to Heath Town Rangers, the name and badge was chosen by the players in 2001.

The club changed its name from Heath Town Rangers to its present name midway through the 2010–11 season.

History
The club entered the West Midlands (Regional) League in 2005–06 competing in the youth league. The next season they entered their first team into Division Two and in the 2006–07 season the club won the Division Two title and also claimed the Youth League title. In 2007–08 season they entered a reserve team into Division Two and the Heath Town Rangers first team gained promotion from Division One into the Premier Division by finishing in third place. They also won the Staffordshire Challenge Cup in the same season. In their first season in the Premier Division they finished eighth and reached the final of the League Cup which was postponed and never played. Part way through the 2010–11 season the club changed its name from Heath Town Rangers to Wolverhampton Sporting Community Football Club. Sporting won the 2017–18 West Midlands (Regional) League Premier Division double, finishing the league with a total of 104 points and beating Black Country Rangers 3-0 in the Premier Cup Final. They gained promotion into the Midland Football League following their league victory.

For the 2018-19 season Sporting hired Steve Hinks as manager, however, he left the club bottom of the Midland Football League to take over at Nuneaton Borough, for Hinks's replacement, the club hired former Black Country Rangers boss, Wayne Spicer, in December 2018. Spicer's first game in charge was a 1-1 draw away against Worcester City.  At the end of the 2020–21 season the club were transferred to Division One of the Midland League when the Premier Division of the West Midlands (Regional) League lost its status as a step six division.

Ground
Following a period of ground-sharing at the Cottage Ground, the current home of Wednesfield F.C., Sporting moved to Pride Park, Great Wyrley, in 2014. The ground itself has two stands which are both at the clubhouse end of the pitch at either corner flag, the stand on the left has rows of benches which have been painted in the colours of the club, while the stand on the right has proper seats in it, standing is available round all other sides of the pitch. The ground also has floodlights and a viewing balcony. Catering is covered on the second floor of the clubhouse with a full bar and catering facility.

Current squad

Coaching staff

Honours
League
West Midlands (Regional) League Premier Division
Champions (1): 2017-18
West Midlands (Regional) League Division Two
Champions (1): 2006-07
West Midlands (Regional) League Youth League
Champions (1): 2006-07

Cup
Staffordshire Challenge Cup
Champions (1): 2008
West Midlands (Regional) League Premier Cup
Champions (1): 2018
Runners-up (1): 2016
Finalists (1): 2009 - Game Abandoned (Never Replayed)

Records
FA Vase: Fifth Round 2017–18

References

External links
Pitchero club website

Football clubs in England
Sport in Wolverhampton
Football clubs in the West Midlands (county)
West Midlands (Regional) League
2001 establishments in England
Association football clubs established in 2001
Midland Football League